The Kluang District is a district in Johor, Malaysia. Its district capital is Kluang Town. Kluang district is one of the three landlocked districts in Johor, the other being Segamat and Kulai.

Geography
Kluang District is 2,851.64 km2 in size.

Kluang District is bordered by Segamat in the north, Batu Pahat in the west and Mersing in the east. The southern border of Kluang district meets Pontian, Kulai and Kota Tinggi. As the central district, it borders the most districts in Johor.

Administrative divisions

Kluang District is divided into eight mukims, which are:
Kluang Municipal Council
 Kahang
 Kluang Town
 Niyor
 Paloh
Simpang Renggam District Council
 Layang-Layang
 Machap
 Renggam
 Ulu Benut

Government
Kluang is divided into two local councils namely Simpang Renggam District Council based at Simpang Renggam Town and Kluang Municipal Council based at Kluang Town which is also the district capital.

Other Town 
Paloh
Kahang
Renggam
Machap
Simpang Renggam
Layang-Layang

Federal Parliament and State Assembly Seats

List of Kluang district representatives in the Federal Parliament (Dewan Rakyat) 

List of Kluang district representatives in the State Legislative Assembly (Dewan Undangan Negeri)

Demographics

As of 2010, total population of Kluang District was 319,629 people. In 2000, the population growth was 1.48%.

Economy
The main economy activities in the district are agriculture and ecotourism. Main industrial areas are located in Kluang Town, Paloh, Renggam, Simpang Renggam, Machap, Kahang, Ulu Benut and Layang-Layang.

Education 
Kluang district has 28 primary schools, 21 Chinese schools, 17 Tamil schools, and 20 secondary schools for a total of 86 schools. In 2014, there were more than 38,000 students and 3,300 teachers.

Transportation
 Kluang Airport

See also
 List of districts in Malaysia

References

External links